Set Me Free is the fifth and final album by singer Jermaine Stewart. The album was withdrawn from release by Reprise Records, but many fans have copies of it. Some copies still exist on cassette format as well the album has been remastered and shared within the fan community.

Track listing
 "Intro (The Riot)" - 0:46
 "Set Me Free" - 4:17
 "Conclusion" - 0:20
 "Happiness" - 3:51
 "Dippin'" - 0:16
 "Special" - 4:53
 "Never in a Million Years" - 3:52
 "Shell-Shock" - 4:57
 "Don't Sit Down" - 5:38
 "Friends Like You" - 5:32
 "Good Times" - 6:45
 "I Just Want To" - 5:27
 "Ask No Questions" - 5:01
 "I'm in XTC" - 0:09
 "XTC" - 3:56
 "Set Me Free" (Reprise) - 4:20
 "Money" - 4:52

Outtakes:
"Basement Boy" (Unreleased) - 4:17
"Lifestyle" - 5:07 (alternative take released on The Best of Jermaine Stewart and A Tribute to Jermaine Stewart, Attention.)

References 

Jermaine Stewart albums
Unreleased albums